The triumph of love has been a popular allegory in art since at least the Italian Renaissance. It is especially popular in domestic items such as desci da parto and cassoni.  

Triumph of Love or The Triumph of Love may also refer to:

Books
 The Triumph of Love (play), a 1732 play by Marivaux
The Triumph of Love, poems by Edmond Holmes 1902
The Triumph of Love, a sonnet-sequence by Govinda Krishna Chettur 1932
Triumph of Love, a romantic novel by Barbara McMahon 1995
The Triumph of Love, a poetry collection by Geoffrey Hill 1999

Film
 The Triumph of Love (1922 film), an Australian silent film
 Triumph of Love (1929 film), a German silent film
 Triumph of Love (1938 film), an Italian film
 The Triumph of Love (2001 film), a film based on the play
 Triunfo del amor (Triumph of Love), a 2011 telenovela

Music
 Triomphe de l'Amour, a 1681 ballet composed by Jean-Baptiste Lully
 Triumph of Love (musical), a 1997 musical based on the play
 Le Triomphe de l'amour (album), a 2001 album by Areski